Cheqa Kabud (also Romanized as Cheqā Kabūd; also known as Chega Kabūd, Cheqād Kabūd, and Cheqā Kabūd-e Seyāh Seyāh) is a village in Howmeh-ye Jonubi Rural District, in the Central District of Eslamabad-e Gharb County, Kermanshah Province, Iran. At the 2006 census, its population was 1,601, in 341 families.

References 

Populated places in Eslamabad-e Gharb County